BDA may refer to:

Businesses or groups
Banco de Desenvolvimento de Angola
Banco Delta Asia, a bank in Macau suspected of harboring North Korean financial assets
Bangalore Development Authority
BDA China Limited, is a business advising firm based in Beijing, China
Beijing Economic and Technological Development Area
Bhubaneswar Development Authority, agency responsible for the development of Bhubaneswar, Orissa, India
Bohol Deaf Academy, Philippines
British Deaf Association
British Dental Association
British Dietetic Association, a professional association and trade union for dietitians in the United Kingdom
British Dragon Boat Racing Association, UK governing body for dragon boat racing as a sport and recreation
Bund Deutscher Architekten or Association of German Architects
Bundesvereinigung der Deutschen Arbeitgeberverbände or Confederation of German Employers' Associations

Technology
Benzylideneacetone, an organic compound
Bi-directional amplifier
Blu-ray Disc Association, responsible for developing and promoting the Blu-ray Disc
Brazilian Decimetric Array, a radio interferometer telescope
Broadcast Driver Architecture, a Microsoft Windows technology that enables tuner drivers for digital reception from many sources

Transport
L.F. Wade International Airport, formerly Bermuda International Airport (IATA code: BDA) – the airport serving the island of Bermuda
Cosworth BDA, a Cosworth-developed Ford Motorsport engine

Other uses
Bomb damage assessment, or battle damage assessment
Biotinylated dextran amine, a chemical compound used in neuroanatomical tracing
Browning BDA, shortened BDA, an alternate name for the FN HP-DA pistol.